The Gondrand Group,  member of Nordic Transport Group (NTG), a leading transport group headquartered in Denmark,  is an international freight forwarding and logistics provider for land transports, sea freight, air freight and contract logistics.

Worldwide locations 
Over 100 branches in 26 countries:
 China
 Czech Republic
 Germany
 Hong Kong
 Hungary
 Italy
 Netherlands
 Switzerland
 Denmark
 Sweden
 Finland
 Norway
 Estonia
 Latvia
 Lithuania
 Poland
 Belgium
 Slovakia
 Turkey
 Bulgaria
 Russia
 Kazakhstan
 Belarus
 Ukraine
 Thailand
 USA

External links 
 Website Gondrand Group
 Website NTG Group

Logistics companies of Switzerland